Ferdinandshof is a municipality in the Vorpommern-Greifswald district, in Mecklenburg-Vorpommern, Germany.

Transport
 Ferdinandshof railway station is served by regional services to Berlin, Angermünde, Eberswalde, Pasewalk and Stralsund.

References

Vorpommern-Greifswald